Beats Pill is a brand of portable Bluetooth speakers produced by Beats Electronics. The Pill was released in 2012. The devices include 3.5 mm audio input and output jacks and charges over a Micro USB port.

Design and functionality 

Its appearance is characterized by curved surfaces and a gloss finish. The speaker contains minimal controls; the logo serves as a multi-purpose button for starting and stopping tracks, and the only other buttons are volume keys and the power button.

The Pill uses Bluetooth to connect to a device (such as a smartphone), and also supports near-field communication for device pairing. It also includes 3.5mm audio input and output jacks. The Pill charges over a Micro USB port, and comes with a USB AC adapter. The device also includes a microphone so it can be used as a speakerphone. The Pill is also an aptX-certified device. In 2013, updated versions of the Pill, Beats Pill 2.0, were released. The new models have longer battery life, a port for charging other USB devices, the ability to pair Pills together with near-field communication (NFC) to play the same audio either individually, or handling left and right stereo channels respectively, character stands, and a new, larger "XL" version.

On June 3, 2015, Beats voluntarily recalled all Pill XL models, citing that in rare cases, the battery may overheat and combust.

Beats Pill+

The Beats Pill+ was unveiled in October 2015, as the first revision to the product released under Apple Inc. ownership. The Pill+ is slightly larger than the previous model, and carries a refreshed design with top-mounted volume controls and a Beats logo button. The Pill's speaker hardware was redesigned to improve sound quality. The Pill+ uses Apple's Lightning connector instead of USB, and can charge supported iOS products from its battery—which has an increased capacity rated for 12 hours of use on a single charge. The Pill+ has a companion mobile app for iOS and Android devices, used for pairing speakers together (in place of NFC), and allowing multiple users to alternate playing music on a single Pill ("DJ mode").

Promotion 
Playing off its design, initial marketing for the Pill used the tagline "Just what the doctor ordered". As with other Beats products, the Pill was promoted primarily through celebrity endorsements and product placements in pop music videos, such as Britney Spears' "Work Bitch", where the speaker is used as a ball gag on a dancer in a BDSM-themed scene. In April 2013, a limited edition, Nicki Minaj-branded pink version of the Pill was released, as introduced in her video for "High School".

A commercial for the Beats Pill starred Robin Thicke and Pharrell Williams; reprising their music video for "Blurred Lines", it featured scenes of female dancers using the speakers as a prop. The United Kingdom's Advertising Standards Authority received 97 complaints over the ad, alleging that it contained sexually suggestive imagery. The ASA ruled in October 2013 that "taken as a whole, the ad did not show sustained, overtly sexual or provocative behaviour". However, it did deem the advert to be inappropriate for airing before 7:30 pm.

Another campaign featuring anthropomorphic versions of the speakers debuted during the 2013 MTV Video Music Awards, which were voiced by musicians such as Chris Rock, Eminem, and Tichina Arnold. Follow-up ads in the campaign included references to events that occurred during the show, and one where Siri refuses to invite the characters to attend a party being held by Dr. Dre to celebrate the company's sale to Apple.

The 2014 film Transformers: Age of Extinction features a product placement where the character Joshua Joyce turns programmable matter into the Pill and offers it to another character. It received a "worst product placement" award as a result.

Reception 
The Beats Pill was met with mixed reviews; while praise was received for its hardware design, ease-of-use, and the levels of volume it could produce, the Pill was primarily criticized for its audio quality and price. PC Magazine in particular criticized its handling of bass, concluding that it "offers a unique form factor and doubles as a good speakerphone, but it simply doesn't offer good enough sound quality to justify its $200 price tag. While you might get a reasonably loud and clear listening experience on one track, the next might pop distractingly and force you to tweak the volume just because it has slightly more bass." Wired felt that the Pill's difficulty with bass was ironic, given that the Beats by Dr. Dre headphones had emphasized the low-end as its "sonic signature".

CNET was similarly mixed, noting unique features such as its "striking design", NFC support, the ability to serve as a pass-through device for other audio systems, and its "relatively detailed sound (notice the use of the word 'relatively') with respectable bass compared with other tiny speakers in its class." However, connectivity issues were noticed with devices running iOS 6, and its review score was later revised from 3.5 to just 3 out of 5, citing the introduction of competing products offering equivalent or better sound quality and a lower price than the Pill.

In a brief demo, The Verge felt that the Pill+ was "the most attractive-looking and sounding speaker that Beats has ever made", noticing that its design refinements felt influenced by Apple's corporate hardware design language, and that in terms of audio quality, "for lack of a better way to describe it, there was space in between all the sounds coming out of the speaker, whereas most others tend to crush all the different frequencies together." PC Magazine felt that the Pill+ offered a "clean, well-defined, balanced listening experience", but that since their drivers were not angled upward, "you miss much of the definition the tweeters bring to the table unless they happen to be lined up with your ears." It was argued that the Pill+ was lacking in "power and bass depth" for its price point, but that its "clean audio delivery" made up for it.

See also
 Loudspeaker enclosure

References

Bluetooth speakers
Products introduced in 2012
Apple Inc. hardware